A straw hat is  a brimmed hat that is woven out of straw or straw-like materials.

Straw Hat may also refer to:

 Straw Hat (film), a 1971 Czechoslovak comedy film
 The Straw Hat, a 1974 Soviet musical comedy television film
 The Straw Hat (Lytras), a 1925 oil painting by Nikolaos Lytras
 Monkey D. Luffy, or Straw Hat, the main character from the One Piece  manga series

See also
 Balibuntal hat, a traditional straw hat from the Philippines
 Un Chapeau de Paille d'Italie (disambiguation)